The Western Growers Association (WGA) is an association representing family farmers who grow fresh produce and tree nuts in California, Arizona, Colorado and New Mexico. The issues they advocate on include farm labor regulation, immigration and guest worker programs, environment and sustainability, pest control, and water. They have offices in Sacramento (California), Phoenix (Arizona), and Washington, D.C.

History

WGA was founded in 1926.

Reception
The WGA has been cited in articles in the New York Times on issues related to agriculture and regulation thereof, and in particular immigration and guest worker programs associated with agricultural labor. It has also been cited and quoted as an authority on produce, farm labor and immigration issues in articles in Forbes, CNN, and the Wall Street Journal.

References

External links

Agricultural organizations based in the United States